Kabujogera is a settlement in Kitagwenda District, in Western Uganda. It is one of the two municipalities in the newly created Kitagwenda District, the other being Ntara Town Council, where the district headquarters are located.

Location
The geographical coordinates of Kabujogera are: 0°05'43.0"S, 30°23'49.0"E (Latitude:-0.095278; Longitude:30.396944).

Overview
The town of Kabujogera is one of the two municipalities in Kitagwenda District. The other is the larger Ntara Municipality, which serves as the district headquarters.

Economic activities
Agriculture and fishing is the mainstay of the economy., the Crops raised include:

 Sorghum
 Maize
 Millet
 Peas
 Groundnuts
 Sunflower
 Sweet potatoes
 Beans
 Tea
 Coffee
 Cotton
 Tomatoes
 Cabbage
 Onions
 Pineapples

See also
 Empire of kitara
 Toro sub-region
 Kitagwenda District
 Western Region, Uganda

References

External links
Kamwenge LCV Chairman Calls For Cohesion AS District Split Nears Fruition As of 22 January 2019.
 Kamwenge Finally Lets Go of New Kitagwenda District As of 29 June 2019.

Populated places in Western Region, Uganda
Cities in the Great Rift Valley
Kitagwenda District